Poeciloderma sexfasciatum is a species of beetle in the family Cerambycidae, the only species in the genus Poeciloderma.

References

Heteropsini